A civil parish is an administrative division in England, the lowest tier of local government.

Civil parish may also refer to :
 Civil parishes in Ireland, territorial units in the Republic of Ireland and Northern Ireland, which though not abolished are essentially obsolete.
 Civil parishes in Scotland, former units of local government in Scotland, replaced by communities
 Civil parishes in Wales, former units of local government in Wales, replaced by communities
 Civil parishes of local government in Canada are in some provinces sub-county level divisions.
 Civil parishes in Portugal (subdivisions of municipalities) are known as freguesias

See also 
 Parish (administrative division)
 Parish (disambiguation)